Paul Brothers may refer to:

Paul Brothers (Canadian football) (born 1945), American quarterback for BC Lions and Ottawa Rough Riders
Paul Brothers (sportscaster), Canadian television personality since 2006
Paul Brothers, American twin actors and bodybuilders David Paul and Peter Paul (born 1957)
Paul Brothers, American actors, boxers and internet personalities Logan Paul (born 1995) and Jake Paul (born 1997)